Mahfooz Aviation is a charter airline based in Banjul, Gambia.

Fleet
The Mahfooz Aviation has no own  aircraft (as of September 2019):

Former fleet

References

External links
Mahfooz Aviation Fleet

Airlines of the Gambia